Rubus liebmannii is a Mesoamerican species of brambles in the rose family. It grows in southern Mexico (Veracruz, Oaxaca, Chiapas) and Central America (Guatemala, Nicaragua).

The species is named for Danish botanist Frederik Michael Liebmann, 1813–1856.

Rubus liebmannii is a perennial to 3 meters tall, with scattered hairs and curved prickles. Leaves are compound with 3 leaflets. Flowers are rose-colored. Fruits are black.

References

liebmannii
Flora of Central America
Flora of Mexico
Plants described in 1874